Pocona Canton is one of the cantons of the Pocona Municipality in the Carrasco Province in the Cochabamba Department in central Bolivia.

Visitor attractions 
 Inkallaqta

References 
 www.ine.gov.bo

External links
 Map of Carrasco Province

Cantons of Cochabamba Department
Cantons of Bolivia